Perdono (i.e. "Forgive Me") is a 1966 Italian "musicarello" film directed by Ettore Maria Fizzarotti. It is named after the Caterina Caselli's hit song "Perdono". It is the sequel to Nessuno mi può giudicare.

Plot 
Federico, his girlfriend Laura and her cousin, Caterina, are three young people full of hope, united by a great friendship that seems indissoluble. The three work in a department store but, when Caterina decides to attempt a musical career, given her vocal skills, everything changes. Caterina becomes a successful singer and Federico falls in love with her. Caterina, who however does not want to make her cousin Laura suffer, pretends not to reciprocate the young man by making him put his head in order. Meanwhile, the plots of various secondary characters evolve, in particular the fresh marriage between the security guard Antonio and the secretary of the department stores Adelina.

The film ends with Catherine singing the song Perdono at a show.

Cast 
 Laura Efrikian as Laura 
  Fabrizio Moroni as  Federico 
 Caterina Caselli as  Caterina 
 Clelia Matania as  Adelina 
 Nino Taranto as  Antonio  
 Gino Bramieri as  Director  
 Paolo Panelli as  Paolo 
 Carlo Croccolo as  Gennarino
 Vittorio Congia as  Vittorio 
 Marisa Del Frate as  Paola
 Gabriele Antonini as  Mario
 Dolores Palumbo as  Laura's Mother
 Enrico Viarisio as  Enrico
 Carlo Delle Piane as  Carlo
 Carlo Taranto as  Peppiniello
 Mirella Pompili as Mirella
 Milena Vukotic as The English Teacher
 Nino Terzo as  Nino

References

External links

1966 films
Musicarelli
1966 musical comedy films
Films directed by Ettore Maria Fizzarotti
Italian sequel films
Titanus films
1960s Italian-language films
1960s Italian films